Eric Abdul (Oranjestad, 26 February 1986) is an Aruban player of association football in the position of goalkeeper.

Career

Clubs
Abdul was a youth player for Sparta Rotterdam, where he made it to the Young Sparta Rotterdam selection. Next he played a season in the first section of DHC Delft and from 2012 through the end of 2013 he was a goalkeeper for the Hendrik-Ido-Ambacht side ASWH.

Abdul then returned to his native Aruba, playing from January 2014 for SV Estrella. Since July 2014 he is a goalie at SV Dakota, where he still played in 2021.

International
In 2011 Abdul was selected to the Aruba national football team. He played in several games for the team. In 2012 he won the ABCS Tournament with the Aruba national football team.

Family
His brother David is a forward.

References

1986 births
Living people
Aruban footballers
Association football goalkeepers
Aruban expatriate footballers
Dutch footballers
ASWH players
Sparta Rotterdam players
SV Dakota players
SV Estrella players
Aruba international footballers